Kelvin Grove Teachers' College was established in 1961 to provide courses in primary and secondary teacher education from its predecessor the Queensland Teachers' Training College.

The Queensland Teachers' Training College was established in 1914 with 25 enrolments. In 1923 the college moved to the "old" Trades Hall on the corner of Edward and Turbot Streets in Brisbane, where it remained until January 1942. The following month, the College moved to the campus of the North Brisbane Intermediate School at Kelvin Grove, when it had an enrolment of 676 students, most in its primary teaching course.  At that time the student population also included 72 mature-aged students recruited to meet the shortage of teachers due to war-time exigencies.

The College subsequently underwent a series of name changes, initially to the Senior Teachers' Training College (1944), and then to the Queensland Teachers' College (1950), Kelvin Grove Teachers' College (1961), Kelvin Grove College of Teacher Education (1974), Kelvin Grove College of Advanced Education (1976), Kelvin Grove Campus of the Brisbane College of Advanced Education (1982), and Kelvin Grove Campus of the Queensland University of Technology (1990).

Notable alumni
Fran Bailey
Major General Michael Fairweather, AM
Alan Jones
Laurie Lawrence, former Australian Olympic swimming coach and Rugby Union international.

References

Teachers colleges in Australia
Colleges of Advanced Education